The Six Assurances are six key foreign policy principles of the United States regarding United States–Taiwan relations. They were passed as unilateral U.S. clarifications to the Third Communiqué between the United States and the People's Republic of China in 1982. They were intended to reassure both Taiwan and the United States Congress that the US would continue to support Taiwan even if it had earlier cut formal diplomatic relations.

The assurances were originally proposed by the then Kuomintang (Chinese Nationalist Party) government of the Republic of China on Taiwan during negotiations between the U.S. and the People's Republic of China. The U.S. Reagan administration agreed to the assurances and informed the United States Congress of them in July 1982.

Today, the Six Assurances are part of semiformal guidelines used in conducting relations between the US and Taiwan. The assurances have been generally reaffirmed by successive U.S. administrations. Prior to 2016, they were purely informal, but in 2016, their formal content was adopted by the US House of Representatives and the Senate in non-binding resolutions, upgrading their status to formal but not directly enforceable.

Text
The United States House of Representatives passed a concurrent resolution on May 16, 2016, giving the first formal wording for the Six Assurances by more or less directly adopting how the former Assistant Secretary of State for East Asian and Pacific Affairs John H. Holdridge expressed them in 1982 (which was delivered to Taiwan's President Chiang Ching-kuo by then-Director of the American Institute in Taiwan James R. Lilley):
 “* * * [W]e did not agree to set a date certain for ending arms sales to Taiwan”;
 “* * * [W]e see no mediation role for the United States” between Taiwan and the PRC;
 “* * *[N]or will we attempt to exert pressure on Taiwan to enter into negotiations with the PRC”;
 “* * * [T]here has been no change in our longstanding position on the issue of sovereignty over Taiwan”;
 “We have no plans to seek” revisions to the Taiwan Relations Act; and
 The August 17 Communiqué “should not be read to imply that we have agreed to engage in prior consultations with Beijing on arms sales to Taiwan”.

A similar resolution passed the Senate on July 6, 2016.

In the first version, which was introduced to Congress by Rep. Steve Chabot on October 28, 2015, the Six Assurances were proposed to be:

 The United States would not set a date for termination of arms sales to Taiwan;
 The United States would not alter the terms of the Taiwan Relations Act;
 The United States would not consult with China in advance before making decisions about United States arms sales to Taiwan;
 The United States would not mediate between Taiwan and China;
 The United States would not alter its position about the sovereignty of Taiwan which was, that the question was one to be decided peacefully by the Chinese themselves, and would not pressure Taiwan to enter into negotiations with China; and
 The United States would not formally recognize Chinese sovereignty over Taiwan.

Declassified cables, sent in 1982 from the State Department, detail the Six Assurances:

 The United States has not agreed to set a date for ending arms sales to Taiwan.
 The United States has not agreed to consult with the PRC on arms sales to Taiwan.
 The United States will not play a mediation role between Taipei and Beijing.
 The United States has not agreed to revise the Taiwan Relations Act.
 The United States has not altered its position regarding sovereignty over Taiwan.
 The United States will not exert pressure on Taiwan to enter into negotiations with the PRC.

Reaffirmation
The State Department has reaffirmed the Six Assurances repeatedly.

On May 19, 2016, one day before Tsai Ing-wen assumed the Presidency of the Republic of China, U.S. Senators Marco Rubio (R-FL), a member of the Senate Foreign Relations Committee and Senate Select Committee on Intelligence and Bob Menendez (D-NJ), former chair of the Senate Foreign Relations Committee and co-chair of the Senate Taiwan Caucus, introduced a concurrent resolution reaffirming the Taiwan Relations Act and the “Six Assurances” as cornerstones of United States–Taiwan relations.

The Republican Party Platform of the 2016 Republican National Convention mentions the Six Assurances, stating, "We salute the people of Taiwan, with whom we share the values of democracy, human rights, a free market economy, and the rule of law. Our relations will continue to be based upon the provisions of the Taiwan Relations Act, and we affirm the Six Assurances given to Taiwan in 1982 by President Reagan. We oppose any unilateral steps by either side to alter the status quo in the Taiwan Straits on the principle that all issues regarding the island’s future must be resolved peacefully, through dialogue, and be agreeable to the people of Taiwan. If China were to violate those principles, the United States, in accord with the Taiwan Relations Act, will help Taiwan defend itself. We praise efforts by the new government in Taipei to continue constructive relations across the Taiwan Strait and call on China to reciprocate. As a loyal friend of America, Taiwan has merited our strong support, including free trade agreement status, the timely sale of defensive arms including technology to build diesel submarines, and full participation in the World Health Organization, International Civil Aviation Organization, and other multilateral institutions."

The Asia Reassurance Initiative Act states that it is the policy of the U.S. to enforce commitments to Taiwan consistent with the Six Assurances. As of September 2018, the Donald Trump administration "has stated that the U.S.-Taiwan relationship is also 'guided' by [the] 'Six Assurances'".

In November 2020 U.S. Secretary of State Mike Pompeo stated “Taiwan has not been a part of China, and that was recognized with the work that the Reagan administration did to lay out the policies that the United States has adhered to now for three and a half decades, and done so under both administrations.” which was seen as invoking clause 5.

The National Defense Authorization Act for Fiscal Year 2021 reconfirmed the Taiwan Relations Act (TRA) and the Six Assurances as the foundation for US-Taiwan relations.

On August 2, 2022, Speaker of the House, Nancy Pelosi, in a statement from a visit to Taiwan, made reference to the United States' continuing support of the TRA, Three Communiqués, and the Six Assurances.

See also
 Political status of Taiwan
 Taiwan–United States relations
 Taiwan Relations Act
 Taiwan Travel Act, passed in 2018; further strengthening ties between the United States and Taiwan

References

External links
U.S. Department of State Press Release - Nov. 10th, 2004
The "Six Assurances" to Taiwan
The July 2007 CRS Report to Congress
Heritage Foundation: President Reagan's Six Assurances to Taiwan and Their Meaning Today
Heritage Foundation: Why the Administration Should Reaffirm the "Six Assurances" to Taiwan
公投入聯國 美國反對 民進黨不退縮

Taiwan–United States relations
Cross-Strait relations
1982 in the United States
1982 in Taiwan
1982 documents
1982 in international relations
Public policy of the Reagan administration